Giannis Fivos Botos (born 20 December 2000) is a Greek professional footballer who plays as an attacking midfielder for Super League 2 club AEK Athens B.

Career

AEK Athens
On 27 June 2018, Botos signed a professional contract with AEK Athens. On 19 January 2020, he made his debut in the Superleague in a 3–0 home win game against AEL coming on as a second-half substitute replacing the scorer of the second goal Nélson Oliveira at the 68th minute. 

Botos is the first footballer in the history of AEK Athens, born after 2000, who has scored in an official game, at 4–0 away victory over Apollon Larissa at 31 October 2018.

Loan to Go Ahead Eagles
On 30 December 2020, Botos joined Go Ahead Eagles on loan until the summer of 2022. In May 2021, Go Ahead Eagles finished second in the Eerste Divisie, earning promotion back to the Eredivisie after four seasons in the second tier. 
He made an impressive match on 28 August, as he scored, to help his team seal an 2–0 win over Sparta Rotterdam. He was voted man of the match for his performance.

Career statistics

Club

References

External links
Soccerway Profile

2000 births
Living people
Greece under-21 international footballers
Greece youth international footballers
Super League Greece players
Eredivisie players
Eerste Divisie players
Moldovan Super Liga players
AEK Athens F.C. players
Go Ahead Eagles players
FC Sheriff Tiraspol players
Greek expatriate footballers
Expatriate footballers in the Netherlands
Expatriate footballers in Moldova
Greek expatriate sportspeople in the Netherlands
Greek expatriate sportspeople in Moldova
Association football midfielders
Footballers from Athens
Greek footballers